Tomer Capone (also Kapon or Kappon or Capon, ; born July 15, 1985) is an Israeli actor. He has starred in popular Israeli exported television such as Hostages and the political thriller television series Fauda. In 2016 he was awarded an Ophir Award for Best Supporting Actor in One Week and a Day. He stars in When Heroes Fly and in the Amazon series The Boys.

Biography
Capone was born in Holon, Israel, the second child of business-owner parents. Raised in the city of Rishon LeZion, he is related to Israeli director Shay Capon. After graduating high school, in 2004 Capone was conscripted into the Israel Defense Forces. He served as a soldier and later a squad leader with the IDF's 202nd battalion of the Paratroopers Brigade.

At the age of 26, he resided in the Hatikva Quarter of Tel Aviv, where he attended The Yoram Loewenstein Performing Arts Studio for a year.

In a 2019 interview, he addressed the spelling of his surname: "It's supposed to be with an 'e' at the end, but we don't want people to read it 'Capone' like the gangster. We don't want any misunderstandings."

Capone has been in a relationship with Israeli actress Ortal Ben-Shoshan since 2012.

Television and film career
He has starred in popular Israeli exports such as Hostages and the political thriller television series Fauda. Capone also starred in the first season of the Israeli series Taagad (Charlie Golf One). He made his film debut in 2015 in the Natalie Portman-directed film A Tale of Love and Darkness. In 2016 he was awarded an Ophir Award for Best Supporting Actor in the drama One Week and a Day.

In 2017, he was one of several Israeli celebrities who recreated iconic Israeli photos to celebrate the country's 69th year of independence. Kapon recreated the Life cover of Yossi Ben Hanan after the Six-Day War, which showed him as a young IDF troop triumphantly clutching a rifle while standing in the waters of the Suez Canal.

In 2018, he starred in the series, When Heroes Fly. He plays a war veteran of a Special Forces unit, reuniting with three friends for one final mission in the Colombian jungle. The thriller series was awarded the prize of Best Series at the CannesSeries festival. The series was acquired by Netflix and has been available since early 2019.

Also in 2018, Capone was a spokesmodel, along with Shlomit Malka, for the Israeli fashion chain, Fox.

In June 2018, Capone was cast as Frenchie in the Amazon superhero series, The Boys. The series premiered on July 26, 2019. Ahead of the premiere, Amazon renewed The Boys for a second season.

Filmography

Film

Television

References

External links 
 

Israeli male film actors
Israeli male television actors
Jewish Israeli male actors
Living people
1985 births
People from Holon
People from Rishon LeZion
21st-century Israeli male actors